Henry Thorpe Beal Isaacson (September 6, 1898 – November 9, 1970) was a leader in the Church of Jesus Christ of Latter-day Saints (LDS Church), serving as a counselor in the First Presidency to church president David O. McKay from 1965 to 1970.

Isaacson was born in Ephraim, Sanpete County, Utah, to Martin Isaacson and Mary Jemima Beal. Isaacson received his education at Snow Academy (now Snow College), Brigham Young University, Utah State University and the University of California–Berkeley.

On June 20, 1920, Isaacson married Lula Maughan Jones in the Salt Lake Temple. They eventually became the parents of two children. Isaacson worked as a school teacher and athletic coach in Idaho and later was a school district superintendent. He also was involved in insurance sales and real estate. Isaacson was a member of the Utah State University Board of Trustees.

In the LDS Church, Isaacson was ordained a high priest in 1941 by Charles A. Callis of the Quorum of the Twelve Apostles. In 1946, he became a second counselor to LeGrand Richards in the presiding bishopric, and then as first counselor to Joseph L. Wirthlin in 1952. In 1961, he was sustained as an Assistant to the Quorum of the Twelve Apostles.

On October 28, 1965, Isaacson was sustained as a counselor to church president David O. McKay in the First Presidency. Isaacson being called to be a counselor in the First Presidency was unusual since he was not an apostle.  However, President McKay had a great deal of confidence in Isaacson's judgement and past service. There is evidence that Isaacson was already functioning much as a counselor to McKay at the time of his call to the First Presidency.  Isaacson suffered a stroke on February 7, 1966, which severely limited his activities as a counselor. Alvin R. Dyer was added as a counselor to the First Presidency to fill the role Isaacson was to perform. Isaacson was released from the First Presidency upon McKay's death on January 18, 1970, and resumed his former position as an Assistant to the Twelve.

Isaacson died in Salt Lake City, Utah, and was buried at the Salt Lake City Cemetery.

See also
Carl W. Buehner

References

2004 Church News Almanac (Salt Lake City: Deseret Morning News, 2003) pp. 61–62
Leon R. Hartshorn. Outstanding Stories by General Authorities. (Salt Lake City: Deseret Book, 1975) Vol. 3, p. 175.

|-
| colspan="3" style="text-align: center;" |Assistant to the Quorum of the Twelve ApostlesJanuary 23, 1970 – November 9, 1970September 30, 1961 – October 28, 1965
|-

1898 births
1970 deaths
American general authorities (LDS Church)
Snow College alumni
Brigham Young University alumni
Utah State University alumni
University of California, Berkeley alumni
20th-century American educators
People from Ephraim, Utah
Assistants to the Quorum of the Twelve Apostles
Counselors in the First Presidency (LDS Church)
Counselors in the Presiding Bishopric (LDS Church)
Burials at Salt Lake City Cemetery
Latter Day Saints from Utah